The Rawah Wilderness is administered by the USDA Forest Service. It is located on the Canyon Lakes Ranger District of the Roosevelt National Forest in Colorado, near the Wyoming border, and also in the Routt National Forest to its south. It encompasses   and includes 25 named lakes ranging in size from five to 39 acres (20,000 to 160,000 m2). Much of the area is traversed by the Medicine Bow Mountains and the Rawah Range for which it is named. The temperature in the Rawah Wilderness ranges from a low of  during the winter and a high of  during the summer.

References

Protected areas of Larimer County, Colorado
Wilderness areas of Colorado
Protected areas established in 1964
Roosevelt National Forest
Routt National Forest
1964 establishments in Colorado